Verasy (Верасы́) was a musical band created in Belarus (then Belarusian SSR, Soviet Union) in 1971. It was created under the Belarusian State Philarmony, Minsk, director and composer Vasily Rainchik. Verasy is Belarusian for heather (see Calluna).

In 2006 Rainchik created a band of the same name.

Discography
1975 Where to Find Such Happiness
1976 Smells like Chabor
1978 White Birch
1978 Red Poppies
1979 Herbs of Childhood
1980 Наша Дискотека (Our Discotheque)
1980 Robins Hearing a Voice
1985 Музыка Для Всех (Music for All)
Дискография ВИА Верасы

References

External links
"Verasy did not Want to Sing Malinovka", an article in Komsomolskaya Pravda
  as Verasy
  as Верасы

Musical groups established in 1971
Belarusian folk music groups
Belarusian rock music groups
Belarusian folk rock groups
Soviet vocal-instrumental ensembles
Belarusian musical groups
Soviet rock music groups